M. S. Sivasankariah (22 May 1927 – 29 December 2009) was an Indian cricket umpire. He stood in three Test matches between 1975 and 1977.

See also
 List of Test cricket umpires

References

1927 births
2009 deaths
Cricketers from Bangalore
Indian Test cricket umpires